Solana Gabriela Pereyra (born 5 April 1999) is an Argentine footballer who plays as a goalkeeper for Spanish Primera Federación club Real Unión de Tenerife and the Argentina women's national team.

International career
Pereyra made her senior debut for Argentina on 3 August 2019 against Costa Rica in the 2019 Pan American Games.

References

External links
Solana Pereyra at BDFútbol

1999 births
Living people
Sportspeople from San Miguel de Tucumán
Argentine women's footballers
Women's association football goalkeepers
UAI Urquiza (women) players
Segunda Federación (women) players
Argentina women's international footballers
2019 FIFA Women's World Cup players
Pan American Games silver medalists for Argentina
Pan American Games medalists in football
Footballers at the 2019 Pan American Games
Panamanian expatriate women's footballers
Panamanian expatriate sportspeople in Spain
Expatriate women's footballers in Spain
Medalists at the 2019 Pan American Games